The Hyland Hotel, also known as the Everglenn Hotel, is a historic hotel building at 333 Evergreen Avenue in Palmer, Alaska.  It is a -story wood-frame structure with a front-gable roof, and a glass-enclosed porch extending across its front.  The building was enlarged to the rear and resided in 1953.  It was one of the first buildings erected in Palmer after the town was established in 1935.  Myles and Joanna Hyland built the hotel, digging the foundation themselves, and using lumber salvaged from a mining camp dormitory.  The Hylands ran the hotel until their respective deaths (Myles in 1949, Joanna in 1966).

The building was listed on the National Register of Historic Places in 1991.

See also
 National Register of Historic Places listings in Matanuska-Susitna Borough, Alaska

References

1935 establishments in Alaska
Hotel buildings completed in 1935
Hotel buildings on the National Register of Historic Places in Alaska
Buildings and structures on the National Register of Historic Places in Matanuska-Susitna Borough, Alaska